Marc Rochat (born 18 December 1992) is a Swiss World Cup alpine ski racer and specializes in slalom.

Career
During his World Cup career, Rochat has five top ten results. From Lausanne, Vaud, he competed at his first World Championships in 2023, and was fourteenth in the slalom.

World Cup results

Season standings

Top ten results

 0 podiums, 5 top tens (5 SL)

World Championship results

References

External links

1995 births
Living people
Swiss male alpine skiers